Rockets is the debut self-titled studio album by French space rock band Rockets, released in June 1976. It is the only full album by the band to feature vocals in French (albeit, with some English lyrics in two tracks). In spite of their nationality, all subsequent albums are sung in English, with the exception of one song on the second and one on the sixth album.

Track listing

Personnel
Rockets
Christian Le Bartz – vocals
"Little" Gerard L'Her – bass, vocals
Alain Maratrat – guitar
Bernard Torelli – guitar
Michael Goubet – keyboards
Alain Groetzinger – drums, percussion
Additional personnel
Claude Lemoine – production
Karl Heinz Schäfer – strings, arrangements, vocals on "Futur Woman"
J. J. Bernier – photography
François Bréant – keyboards on "Genese Future"

Release history

References

1976 debut albums
Rockets (band) albums